The Krems is an approximately  tributary of the Traun in Upper Austria.

The largest towns in the valley of the Krems are Kirchdorf an der Krems, Schlierbach, Wartberg an der Krems, Kremsmünster, Rohr im Kremstal, Kematen an der Krems, Neuhofen an der Krems and Ansfelden.

References

External links

Rivers of Upper Austria
Rivers of Austria